Irakli Dzaria (born 1 December 1988) is a Georgian professional footballer, who plays as a defensive midfielder.

Club career

Kukësi
On 9 January 2018, Dzaria moved for the first time aboard and joined with Albanian club Kukësi by penning a contract until the end of the season with an option to renew for the next one worth $4,000 per month. He made his debut for the club on 31 January in the first leg of cup's quarter-finals against Tirana.

His first Albanian Superliga appearance came four days later in the 1–1 draw versus Flamurtari Vlorë. Dzaria scored his maiden goal for the team on 24 February in form of a winner in the match against Laçi.

Later on 13 May, he scored a first-half brace in the eventual 2–2 draw versus Luftëtari Gjirokastër which lifted his tally up to 4 goals. He ended the second part of 2017–18 season by making 16 league appearances, all of them as starter, collecting 1320 minutes as Kukësi finished runner-up in the championship.

In June 2018, Kukësi gained the right to play UEFA Champions League football following the Skënderbeu Korçë's 10-year ban; the next month, Dzaria was included in manager Peter Pacult squad for the first qualifying round tie versus Malta's Valletta. In the second leg, with Kukësi trailing 0–1, Dzaria made himself a protagonist by netting in the 84th minute with a right-footed shot inside the box which gave the team a 1–1 draw at National Stadium, Ta' Qali. With the first match ending in a goalless draw, Kukësi progressed to the next round on away goal rule. It was his first Champions League goal, and he described it as the most important goal of his career.

International career
Dzaria earned his first cap with the Georgian national team against Albania in Viseu on 29 February 2012.

International goals
Scores and results list Georgia's goal tally first.

Honours
FC Zestafoni
Georgian League: 2010–11
Dinamo Tbilisi
Georgian League:2012–13, 2013–14
Georgian Cup: 2013, 2014
Georgian Super Cup: 2014

References

External links

1988 births
Living people
Footballers from Georgia (country)
Georgia (country) international footballers
Georgia (country) under-21 international footballers
Expatriate footballers from Georgia (country)
Association football midfielders
FC Kolkheti-1913 Poti players
FC Zestafoni players
FC Dinamo Tbilisi players
FC Dila Gori players
FK Kukësi players
FC Sioni Bolnisi players
Valletta F.C. players
Erovnuli Liga players
Kategoria Superiore players
Maltese Premier League players
Expatriate footballers in Albania
Expatriate footballers in Malta